Roisin is a village of Wallonia and district of the municipality of Honnelles, located in the province of Hainaut, Belgium.

References

External links
 

Former municipalities of Hainaut (province)